Taylor Houser Jacobs (born May 30, 1981) is an American former college and professional football player who was a wide receiver in the National Football League (NFL) for five seasons during the early 2000s. Jacobs played college football for the University of Florida, and thereafter, he played professionally for the Washington Redskins, San Francisco 49ers and Denver Broncos of the NFL.

Early years 

Jacobs was born in Tallahassee, Florida in 1981.  He attended Florida A&M University's Developmental Research High School in Tallahassee, and played high school football for the FAMU DRS Rattlers.  He was named to PrepStar's high school All-America team.  He caught thirty-seven passes for 685 yards and six touchdowns as a senior.  As a junior, he caught thirty-three passes for 708 yards and eleven touchdowns and rushed for 362 yards.  He was also an outstanding baseball player and gifted track athlete.  In 1999, he clocked automatic times of 10.50 and 22.05 seconds, respectively, in the 100-meter and 200-meter dash finals at the Florida Class 1A track and field championship meet.

College career 

Jacobs accepted an athletic scholarship to attend the University of Florida in Gainesville, Florida, where he played for coach Steve Spurrier and coach Ron Zook's Florida Gators football team from 1999 to 2002.  In 1999, Jacobs was the only true freshman wide receiver to play, appearing in ten of twelve games including the Citrus Bowl.  As a sophomore in 2000, he played in all twelve regular-season games with five starts, and recorded seventeen receptions for 198 yards and two touchdowns.  As a junior in 2001, Jacobs played in all twelve games with three starts including the Orange Bowl, and posted thirty-eight catches for 712 yards and seven touchdowns.  As a senior team captain in 2002, Jacobs was Florida's most productive receiver—he finished with seventy-one receptions for 1,088 yards, an average of 98.8 receiving yards per game, and had four 100-yard receiving games.  He started all eleven games, was one of ten semifinalists for the Biletnikoff Award, was a first-team All-Southeastern Conference (SEC) selection, and played in the Senior Bowl and the Hula Bowl all-star games.

Jacobs returned to the University of Florida after his NFL career was over, and completed his bachelor's degree in sociology in 2009.

Professional career 

Jacobs saw limited playing time as he struggled through a series of injuries in his rookie season in 2003. He finished his rookie campaign with eight games played, three catches for 37 yards and a touchdown. In 2004, he appeared in 15 games with four starts. He logged 16 catches for 178 yards, an 11.1 yards per catch average, with a long of 45.

Jacobs was traded to the San Francisco 49ers on August 14, 2006 for Mike Rumph, and released on October 2, 2007.  He was signed by the Denver Broncos on November 6, 2007, and released on August 26, 2008.

See also 

 List of Florida Gators in the NFL Draft
 List of University of Florida alumni
 List of Washington Redskins players

References

Bibliography 

 Carlson, Norm, University of Florida Football Vault: The History of the Florida Gators, Whitman Publishing, LLC, Atlanta, Georgia (2007).  .
 Golenbock, Peter, Go Gators!  An Oral History of Florida's Pursuit of Gridiron Glory, Legends Publishing, LLC, St. Petersburg, Florida (2002).  .
 Hairston, Jack, Tales from the Gator Swamp: A Collection of the Greatest Gator Stories Ever Told, Sports Publishing, LLC, Champaign, Illinois (2002).  .

1981 births
Living people
African-American players of American football
American football wide receivers
Denver Broncos players
Florida Gators football players
Florida Gators men's track and field athletes
Players of American football from Tallahassee, Florida
San Francisco 49ers players
Washington Redskins players
21st-century African-American sportspeople
20th-century African-American people